Harry Everett (11 November 1920 – 1998) was an English professional footballer who played in the Football League for Mansfield Town.

References

1920 births
1998 deaths
English footballers
Association football defenders
English Football League players
Mansfield Town F.C. players
Boston United F.C. players